Julius Wanyoike (born 1967, Gaichanjiro) is an Anglican bishop in Kenya: he has been Bishop of Thika since 2013.

Wanyoike was born in 1967 and trained for ministry at Bishop Kariuki College from 1991 to 1993. He was ordained in 1993. He served at Ngong,  Makongeni and Harborne, Birmingham, England. He is married with three children.

References

21st-century Anglican bishops of the Anglican Church of Kenya
Anglican bishops of Thika
People from Central Province (Kenya)
1967 births
Living people